is an autobahn that connects the federal state capital of Kiel to Hamburg via Autobahn 7. This route serves to further ease the ground transportation route from Kiel to the rest of Holstein and into central Europe.

Exit list

External links 

215
A215